Chest Springs is a borough in Cambria County, Pennsylvania, United States. It is part of the Johnstown, Pennsylvania Metropolitan Statistical Area. The population was 149 at the 2010 census.

Geography
Chest Springs is located in northeastern Cambria County at  (40.578804, -78.609807).

Demographics

At the 2000 census there were 110 people, 50 households, and 30 families in the borough. The population density was 476.9 people per square mile (184.7/km²). There were 50 housing units at an average density of 216.8 per square mile (83.9/km²).  The racial makeup of the borough was 100.00% White.
There were 50 households, 30.0% had children under the age of 18 living with them, 44.0% were married couples living together, 8.0% had a female householder with no husband present, and 40.0% were non-families. 36.0% of households were made up of individuals, and 18.0% were one person aged 65 or older. The average household size was 2.20 and the average family size was 2.93.

The age distribution was 23.6% under the age of 18, 8.2% from 18 to 24, 28.2% from 25 to 44, 20.9% from 45 to 64, and 19.1% 65 or older. The median age was 40 years. For every 100 females there were 100.0 males. For every 100 females age 18 and over, there were 104.9 males.

The median household income was $23,750 and the median family income  was $38,750. Males had a median income of $35,000 versus $26,250 for females. The per capita income for the borough was $14,357. There were no families and 3.7% of the population living below the poverty line, including no under eighteens and 8.7% of those over 64.

References

Populated places established in 1858
Boroughs in Cambria County, Pennsylvania
1858 establishments in Pennsylvania